The "Festgesang", also known as the "Gutenberg Cantata", was composed by Felix Mendelssohn in the first half of 1840 for performance in Leipzig at the celebrations to mark the putative 400th anniversary of the invention of printing with movable type by Johannes Gutenberg. The full title is Festgesang zur Eröffnung der am ersten Tage der vierten Säkularfeier der Erfindung der Buchdruckerkunst auf dem Marktplatz zu Leipzig stattfindenden Feierlichkeiten (Ceremonial song for the opening of the celebrations taking place on the first day of the quadricentennial celebration of the invention of the art of printing on the market square in Leipzig). It was first performed in the market-square at Leipzig on 24 June 1840.

The piece is scored for male chorus with two brass orchestras and timpani, and consists of four parts, the first and last based on established Lutheran chorales. Part 2, beginning "Vaterland, in deinen Gauen", was later adapted to the words of Charles Wesley’s Christmas carol "Hark! The Herald Angels Sing" (against Wesley's original request, as he had originally wanted more somber music, though he had been long deceased by this point). The original German words for Festgesang were by Adolf Eduard Proelss (1803–1882). The use of a large choir and two orchestras was designed to make use of the natural acoustics of the market-place to produce an impressive, resonant sound.

Mendelssohn wrote at least two other "Festgesänge", with which the present work are sometimes confused, known as Festgesang an die Künstler (1846) and Festgesang (“Möge das Siegeszeichen” [1838]).

Lyrics

References

Compositions by Felix Mendelssohn
Cantatas
1840 compositions
German patriotic songs